For Soviet transportation, see Transport in the Soviet Union.

Railways

total:
1,683 km in common carrier service; does not include industrial lines
broad gauge:
1,583 km of  gauge (1993)
narrow gauge:
100 km of  gauge.

City with metro system: Tbilisi (see Tbilisi Metro).

 In April 2005, an agreement was signed to build a railway from Turkey through Georgia to Azerbaijan (see Kars Baku Tbilisi railway line). The line under construction is using  Standard gauge until Akhalkalaki. There will be axle change station for wagons to proceed with broad gauge to Baku.
 In August 2007, Georgia handed over the management rights of the state-owned Georgian Railway company to the U.K.-based company Parkfield Investment for 89 years.

Railway links with adjacent countries

  Russia - yes -  - via the breakaway Autonomous Republic of Abkhazia - closed for political reasons.
  Azerbaijan - yes - .
  Armenia - yes 
  Turkey - yes - break-of-gauge with through  (Standard Gauge).

2007

 February 7 - agreement signed for Kars-Tbilisi-Baku railway

Towns served by rail

 Poti - port
 Batumi - port
 Kutaisi
 Akhaltsike

Highways

Only a limited number of kilometers are express roads or motorways which are in good condition. The quality of the other roads varies greatly.

Motorways
Georgia has a limited multilane expressroad/motorway system, that is under development. In 2021 these sections are: 
 S1 highway Mukhatgverdi (Tbilisi West) - Surami 
 S1 highway Argveta - Samtredia 
 S4 highway Ponichala (Tbilisi) - Rustavi 
 S12 highway Japana - Lanchkhuti 
  
Additionally, the S2 highway has  limited access two-lane freeway (Kobuleti Bypass).

Pipelines
Crude oil 370 km; refined products 300 km; natural gas 440 km (1992)

Black Sea Ports and harbors
Batumi, Poti, Sokhumi, Kulevi Oil Terminal

Merchant marine
total:
ships by type:
cargo ship 10, chemical tanker 1, petroleum tanker 6 (1999 est.)

Airports

28 (1994 est.)
In February 2007 a brand new, modern and fully equipped international Airport was inaugurated in Tbilisi.
Tbilisi - Shota Rustaveli Airport
Batumi - Alexander Kartveli Airport
Kutaisi - David The Builder Airport
Mestia - Queen Tamar Airport
Ambrolauri - Ambrolauri Airport
Poti - Poti International Airport

Airports - with paved runways
total:
14
over 3,047 m:
1
2,438 to 3,047 m:
7
1,524 to 2,437 m:
4
914 to 1,523 m:
1
under 914 m:
1 (1994 est.)

Airports - with unpaved runways
total:
14
over 3,047 m:
1
2,438 to 3,047 m:
1
1,524 to 2,437 m:
1
914 to 1,523 m:
5
under 914 m:
6 (1994 est.)

See also
 Georgia
 List of Tbilisi metro stations

External links

Roads Department of Georgia (ENG)
United Transport Administration (ENG)

Notes